The plus sign  and the minus sign  are mathematical symbols used to represent the notions of positive and negative, respectively. In addition,  represents the operation of addition, which results in a sum, while  represents subtraction, resulting in a difference.

History 
Though the signs now seem as familiar as the alphabet or the Hindu-Arabic numerals, they are not of great antiquity. The Egyptian hieroglyphic sign for addition, for example, resembled a pair of legs walking in the direction in which the text was written (Egyptian could be written either from right to left or left to right), with the reverse sign indicating subtraction:

In early 15th century Europe, the letters "P" and "M" were generally used.

The  may be derived from a tilde written over  when used to indicate subtraction; or it may come from a shorthand version of the letter  itself.

Robert Recorde, the designer of the equals sign, introduced plus and minus to Britain in 1557 in The Whetstone of Witte: "There be other 2 signes in often use of which the first is made thus + and betokeneth more: the other is thus made − and betokeneth lesse."

Plus sign 

It can also serve as a unary operator that leaves its operand unchanged ( means the same as ). This notation may be used when it is desired to emphasize the positiveness of a number, especially in contrast with the negative numbers ( versus ).

The plus sign can also indicate many other operations, depending on the mathematical system under consideration. Many algebraic structures, such as vector spaces and matrix rings, have some operation which is called, or is equivalent to, addition. It is though conventional to use the plus sign to only denote commutative operations.

The symbol is also used in chemistry and physics. For more, see .

Minus sign 

The minus sign, has three main uses in mathematics:
 The subtraction operator: a binary operator to indicate the operation of subtraction, as in 5 − 3 = 2. Subtraction is the inverse of addition.
 The function whose value for any real or complex argument is the additive inverse of that argument. For example, if , then , but if , then . Similarly, .
 A prefix of a numeric constant.  When it is placed immediately before an unsigned numeral, the combination names a negative number, the additive inverse of the positive number that the numeral would otherwise name.  In this usage, '' names a number the same way 'semicircle' names a geometric figure, with the caveat that 'semi' does not have a separate use as a function name.

In many contexts, it does not matter whether the second or the third of these usages is intended:  is the same number.  When it is important to distinguish them, a raised minus sign  is sometimes used for negative constants, as in elementary education, the programming language APL, and some early  graphing calculators.

All three uses can be referred to as "minus" in everyday speech, though the binary operator is sometimes read as "take away". In American English nowadays, −5 (for example) is generally referred to as "negative five" though speakers born before 1950 often refer to it as "minus five". (Temperatures tend to follow the older usage; −5° is generally called "minus five degrees".) Further, a few textbooks in the United States encourage  to be read as "the opposite of " or "the additive inverse of "—to avoid giving the impression that  is necessarily negative (since  itself may already be negative).

In mathematics and most programming languages, the rules for the order of operations mean that  is equal to : Exponentiation binds more strongly than the unary minus, which binds more strongly than multiplication or division. However, in some programming languages (Microsoft Excel in particular), unary operators bind strongest, so in those cases  is 25, but  is −25.

Similar to the plus sign, the minus sign is also used in chemistry and physics.

Use in elementary education 

Some elementary teachers use raised plus and minus signs before numbers to show they are positive or negative numbers. For example, subtracting −5 from 3 might be read as "positive three take away negative 5", and be shown as

 becomes ,
or even as
 becomes .

Use as a qualifier 

In grading systems (such as examination marks), the plus sign indicates a grade one level higher and the minus sign a grade lower. In some occasions, this is extended to two plus or minus signs (e.g.,  being two grades higher than ).

Mathematics
In mathematics the one-sided limit  means  approaches  from the right (i.e., right-sided limit), and  means  approaches  from the left (i.e., left-sided limit).

Blood
Blood types are often qualified with a plus or minus to indicate the presence or absence of the Rh factor. For example, A+ means type A blood with the Rh factor present, while B− means type B blood with the Rh factor absent.

Music
In music, augmented chords are symbolized with a plus sign, although this practice is not universal (as there are other methods for spelling those chords). For example, "C+" is read "C augmented chord". Sometimes the plus is written as a superscript.

Uses in computing 

As well as the normal mathematical usage, plus and minus signs may be used for a number of other purposes in computing.

Plus and minus signs are often used in tree view on a computer screen—to show if a folder is collapsed or not.

In most programming languages, subtraction and negation are indicated with the ASCII hyphen-minus character, .

In C and some other computer programming languages, two plus signs indicate the increment operator and two minus signs a decrement; the position of the operator before or after the variable indicates whether the new or old value is read from it. For example, if x equals 6, then  increments x to 7 but sets y to 6, whereas  would set both x and y to 7. By extension,  is sometimes used in computing terminology to signify an improvement, as in the name of the language C++.

In regular expressions,  is often used to indicate "1 or more" in a pattern to be matched. For example,  means "one or more of the letter x".

There is no concept of negative zero in mathematics, but in computing −0 may have a separate representation from zero. In the IEEE floating-point standard, 1 / −0 is negative infinity whereas 1 / 0 is positive infinity.

Other uses 

In physics, the use of plus and minus signs for different electrical charges was introduced by Georg Christoph Lichtenberg.

In chemistry, superscripted plus and minus signs are used to indicate an ion with a positive or negative charge of 1 (e.g., NH). If the charge is greater than 1, a number indicating the charge is written before the sign (as in SO). The minus sign is also used, in place of an en dash, for a single covalent bond between two atoms as in the skeletal formula.

A plus sign prefixed to a telephone number is used to indicate the form used for International Direct Dialing. Its precise usage varies by technology and national standards.
In the International Phonetic Alphabet, subscripted plus and minus signs are used as diacritics to indicate advanced or retracted articulations of speech sounds.

The minus sign is also used as tone letter in the orthographies of Dan, Krumen, Karaboro, Mwan, Wan, Yaouré, Wè, Nyabwa and Godié. The Unicode character used for the tone letter (U+02D7) is different from the mathematical minus sign.

The plus sign sometimes represents  in the orthography of Huichol.

In the algebraic notation used to record games of chess, the plus sign  is used to denote a move that puts the opponent into check, while a double plus  is sometimes used to denote double check. Combinations of the plus and minus signs are used to evaluate a move (+/−, +/=, =/+, −/+).

In linguistics, a superscript plus  sometimes replaces the asterisk, which denotes unattested linguistic reconstruction.

In botanical names, a plus sign denotes graft-chimaera.

Character codes 

The hyphen-minus sign, is the original ASCII version of the minus sign, which doubles as a hyphen. It is usually shorter in length than the plus sign and often at a different height to the plus-sign's cross bar. It can be used as a substitute for the true minus sign when the character set is limited to ASCII. Most programming languages and other computer readable languages do this, since ASCII is generally available as a subset of most character encodings, while U+2212 is a Unicode feature only. Also several other software programs usable for calculations don't accept the U+2212 minus. For example, pasting =3−2 into Excel or 3−2= into the Windows calculator won't work.

As the true minus is not available on most keyboard layouts, typographers sometimes use the very similar en dash, U+2013, to represent the minus sign although it is "not preferred" in mathematical typesetting. Ways of producing the en dash are available on most computers; see .

Alternative minus signs

There is a commercial minus sign, which is used in Germany and Scandinavia. The symbol  is used to denote subtraction in Scandinavia.

Alternative plus sign 

A Jewish tradition that dates from at least the 19th century is to write plus using the symbol . This practice was adopted into Israeli schools and is still commonplace today in elementary schools (including secular schools) but in fewer secondary schools. It is also used occasionally in books by religious authors, but most books for adults use the international symbol . The reason for this practice is that it avoids the writing of a symbol  that looks like a Christian cross. Unicode has this symbol at position .

See also 
 En dash, a dash that looks similar to the subtraction symbol but is used for different purposes
 Plus–minus sign ±
 Glossary of mathematical symbols
 ⊕ (disambiguation)

References and footnotes

External links 

Elementary arithmetic
Mathematical symbols
Addition
Subtraction

de:Vorzeichen (Zahl)#Plus- und Minuszeichen